Diamond Peak may refer to:
Diamond Peak (Arizona), a summit in the Grand Canyon
Diamond Peak (California)
Diamond Peak (Colorado)
Diamond Peak (Greenland), a mountain in the Stauning Alps
Diamond Peak (Idaho)
Diamond Peak (Montana), a mountain in Flathead County, Montana
Diamond Peak (Nevada)
Diamond Peak (ski area), a ski area in Nevada, United States
Diamond Peak (South Georgia)
Diamond Peak (Oregon)
Diamond Peak Wilderness, a wilderness area in Oregon that includes the Diamond Peak volcano
Diamond Peak (Garfield County, Washington), a mountain in Garfield County, Washington

See also
Diamond Hill (disambiguation)
Diamond Mountain (disambiguation)